The Mohammed V Cup, also known as Mohammed V Trophy was an international football competition in the Kingdom of Morocco held in the cities of Casablanca, Rabat and Marrakech. 

The trophy was named after King Mohammed V, who died one year before the competition was established in 1962. The competition was contested and won by some of the most successful football clubs in the world, such as Real Madrid, Barcelona, Bayern Munich, Atlético Madrid, Boca Juniors, Peñarol, among others. Spanish club Atlético Madrid is the most winning team with 3 titles won.

Champions 
The following is the list of finals played:

The Finals

Notes

References

International club association football competitions hosted by Morocco
Defunct international association football competitions
Recurring sporting events established in 1962
Recurring sporting events disestablished in 1989